Tina Schmidt nee Gramkov (born 12 November 1970) is a Danish sailor who was part of the crew in the Elliott 6m match racing at the 2012 Summer Olympics. She was in the crew alongside Susanne Boidin for helm Lotte Meldegaard Pedersen.

References

External links

1970 births
Living people
Danish female sailors (sport)
Sailors at the 2012 Summer Olympics – Elliott 6m
Olympic sailors of Denmark
People from Lyngby-Taarbæk Municipality
Sportspeople from the Capital Region of Denmark